Diogo Manuel Gonçalves Coelho (born 8 July 1992) is a Portuguese footballer who plays for Lithuanian club FK Sūduva as a left-back.

Club career
Born in Oeiras, Lisbon metropolitan area, Coelho spent nine of his formative years with S.L. Benfica. He made his debut as a senior with G.D. Ribeirão in the 2011–12 season, in the third division.

From 2012 to 2018, Coelho played in the LigaPro, representing in quick succession C.D. Trofense, S.C. Braga B, C.F. União, S.C. Farense, C.D. Santa Clara and Real SC. He played his first match as a professional on 30 September 2012 while at the service of the first of those teams, featuring the full 90 minutes in a 1–1 home draw against S.C. Covilhã.

Coelho spent the 2018 and 2019 campaigns in the Icelandic Úrvalsdeild karla, with ÍBV. On 21 July 2020, FC Gandzasar Kapan announced his signing from Lori FC also of the Armenian Premier League.

On 24 January 2021, Coelho joined Icelandic club Vestri. In June 2022, he moved to the Lithuanian A Lyga with FK Sūduva.

References

External links

1992 births
Living people
People from Oeiras, Portugal
Sportspeople from Lisbon District
Portuguese footballers
Association football defenders
Liga Portugal 2 players
Segunda Divisão players
G.D. Ribeirão players
Real S.C. players
C.D. Trofense players
S.C. Braga B players
C.F. União players
S.C. Farense players
C.D. Santa Clara players
Úrvalsdeild karla (football) players
1. deild karla players
Íþróttabandalag Vestmannaeyja players
Vestri (football club) players
Armenian Premier League players
FC Lori players
FC Gandzasar Kapan players
A Lyga players
FK Sūduva Marijampolė players
Portugal youth international footballers
Portuguese expatriate footballers
Expatriate footballers in Iceland
Expatriate footballers in Armenia
Expatriate footballers in Lithuania
Portuguese expatriate sportspeople in Iceland
Portuguese expatriate sportspeople in Armenia
Portuguese expatriate sportspeople in Lithuania